Kurt Petersen may refer to:

 Kurt Petersen (American football) (born 1957), American football guard
 Kurt Petersen (inventor) (born 1948), American inventor and entrepreneur
 Kurt W. Petersen (born 1934), Danish speedway rider